Erich Welt (born 14 January 1928) is an Austrian former cyclist. He competed in the sprint  and tandem events at the 1948 Summer Olympics.

References

External links
 

1928 births
Possibly living people
Austrian male cyclists
Olympic cyclists of Austria
Cyclists at the 1948 Summer Olympics
Place of birth missing (living people)
20th-century Austrian people